Leonard Earl Mattiace (born October 15, 1967) is an American professional golfer, formerly of the PGA Tour and now playing on the PGA Tour Champions.

Mattiace was born in Mineola, New York. He attended Nease High School in Ponte Vedra, Florida. He graduated from Wake Forest University in 1990 with a degree in Sociology. While at Wake Forest, he played on the team that won the NCAA Division I Golf Championship in 1986. He turned pro later in 1990.

Mattiace first gained notability when he surged into contention in the final round of the 1998 Players Championship. Trailing by one shot going into the par-3 17th hole, he hit his tee shot into the water, his third shot into a bunker, and his fourth shot into the water. He ended up with a quintuple-bogey 8 on the hole and finished in a tie for fifth, four strokes behind the eventual winner Justin Leonard.

Mattiace's career year was 2002, when he earned wins at the Nissan Open (his 220th PGA Tour start) and the FedEx St. Jude Classic. In 2003, he contended in the Masters Tournament by shooting a 65 in the final round which put him into a playoff with Mike Weir. On the first playoff hole, Mattiace found himself stymied by trees when his approach drifted offline. Weir needed only a bogey to secure the victory and Mattiace finished second, earning $648,000 in prize money. Shortly after the 2003 season, Mattiace's career was threatened by a skiing accident and torn ACLs in both knees.

Mattiace was ranked as high as 24th in the Official World Golf Ranking, but was not fully exempt on the PGA Tour after 2005. He made his PGA Tour Champions debut in March 2018 at the Cologuard Classic. He currently resides in Jacksonville, Florida. Mattiace is naturally left-handed but plays right-handed.

Amateur wins
this list may be incomplete
1985 Southern Amateur

Professional wins (2)

PGA Tour wins (2)

PGA Tour playoff record (0–2)

Results in major championships

CUT = missed the half-way cut
"T" = tied

Summary

Most consecutive cuts made – 7 (2002 U.S. Open – 2003 PGA)
Longest streak of top-10s – 1

Results in The Players Championship

CUT = missed the halfway cut
"T" indicates a tie for a place

Results in World Golf Championships

QF, R16, R32, R64 = Round in which player lost in match play
"T" = Tied

U.S. national team appearances
Amateur
Walker Cup: 1987 (winners)

See also
1992 PGA Tour Qualifying School graduates
1995 PGA Tour Qualifying School graduates

References

External links

Len's Friends Foundation official site

American male golfers
Wake Forest Demon Deacons men's golfers
PGA Tour golfers
Golfers from New York (state)
Golfers from Jacksonville, Florida
People from Mineola, New York
1967 births
Living people